Wang Ling (born 9 June 1978 in Liaoyang) is a Chinese former basketball player who competed in the 2004 Summer Olympics.

References

1978 births
Living people
Chinese women's basketball players
Olympic basketball players of China
Basketball players at the 2004 Summer Olympics
Basketball players from Liaoning
Sportspeople from Liaoyang
Asian Games medalists in basketball
Basketball players at the 1998 Asian Games
Asian Games silver medalists for China
Medalists at the 1998 Asian Games
Liaoning Flying Eagles players